The men's singles three-cushion billiards competition at the 2001 World Games took place from 22 to 26 August 2001 at the Selion Plaza in Akita, Japan.

Last 16

Last 8

References

Three-cushion billiard - men's singles
Three-cushion billiards competitions